Tutli Tamak (also Romanized as Tūtlī Tamaḵ) is a village in Zavkuh Rural District, Pishkamar District, Kalaleh County, Golestan Province, Iran. At the 2006 census, its population was 251, in 59 families.

References 

Populated places in Kalaleh County